Institute of Medicine (IOM) in the US is now renamed the National Academy of Medicine (2015).

Institute of Medicine may also refer to:
 Institute of Medicine, Mandalay
 Institute of Medicine, Nepal
 Institute of Medicine 1, Yangon
 Institute of Medicine 2, Yangon